Fighting Squadron 16 or VF-16 was an aviation unit of the United States Navy during World War II. Originally established in 1943, it was disestablished on 16 November 1945.

Operational history

On 23 November VF-16's pilots shot down 17 Japanese aircraft. By the end of 1943 the pilots of VF-16 had shot down 55 Japanese aircraft, with three pilots becoming aces.

On 19 June 1944 while deployed on the Lexington, the squadron participated in the Marianas Turkey Shoot and squadron pilot Lt Alexander Vraciu shot down six Japanese Yokosuka D4Ys in eight minutes.

See also
History of the United States Navy
List of inactive United States Navy aircraft squadrons
List of United States Navy aircraft squadrons

References

Strike fighter squadrons of the United States Navy